HMS A8 was an early Royal Navy submarine.

She was a member of Group Two of the 1903 British A-class of submarines. Like the other members of her class, she was built at Vickers Barrow-in-Furness.

She sank with the loss of 15 crew as a result of an accident whilst running on the surface in Plymouth Sound on 8 June 1905. A sudden dip in the bow caused the submarine to be swamped through the hatch in the conning tower.Only 4 survived. She was salvaged four days after the accident at which point a loose rivet was found in the bow plating. The submarine was then repaired and recommissioned and used for training during the First World War along with A9 as part of the First Submarine Flotilla, operating near Devonport through early 1916. She was scrapped in October 1920 at Dartmouth.

References

External links
 MaritimeQuest HMS A-8 Pages
 HMS A-8 Roll of Honour
 'Submarine Losses 1904 to present day' - Royal Navy Submarine Museum 

 

A-class submarines (1903)
World War I submarines of the United Kingdom
British submarine accidents
Ships built in Barrow-in-Furness
Royal Navy ship names
1905 ships
Maritime incidents in 1905
Shipwrecks of England